Shelbyville Commercial Historic District is a national historic district located at Shelbyville, Shelby County, Indiana.  The district encompasses 149 contributing buildings, 1 contributing site, and 2 contributing objects in the central business district of Shelbyville. It developed between about 1822 and the 1930s, and includes notable examples of Italianate, Second Empire, Beaux-Arts, Classical Revival, and Art Deco style architecture. Notable contributing resources include the Shelbyville Central Schools Administrative Offices (1912), Carnegie Library (1902), First Baptist Church (1903), St. Joseph Catholic Church and School (1908), Civic Center (1932), Melton Jewelry Store (1886), Blessing-Deprez Building (1869), Knights of Pythias (1901), Cherry Building (1889), I.O.O.F. Building (1895), Old High School Building (1886), and a statue of Charles Major (1929).

It was listed on the National Register of Historic Places in 1984.

References

Historic districts on the National Register of Historic Places in Indiana
Italianate architecture in Indiana
Second Empire architecture in Indiana
Beaux-Arts architecture in Indiana
Neoclassical architecture in Indiana
Art Deco architecture in Indiana
Buildings and structures in Shelby County, Indiana
National Register of Historic Places in Shelby County, Indiana